Estevam Eduardo Lemos Soares (born 10 June 1956, in Cafelândia, São Paulo), known as Estevam Soares, is a Brazilian football manager.

Managerial statistics

Honours

Manager
Inter de Limeira
Campeonato Paulista Série A2: 1995

América-RN
Campeonato Potiguar: 1997

CSA
Campeonato Alagoano: 1999

References 

1956 births
Living people
Brazilian footballers
Association football defenders
Brazilian football managers
Expatriate football managers in Lebanon
Expatriate football managers in Saudi Arabia
Campeonato Brasileiro Série A managers
Campeonato Brasileiro Série B managers
Campeonato Brasileiro Série C managers
Campeonato Brasileiro Série D managers
Guarani FC players
Esporte Clube XV de Novembro (Jaú) players
São Paulo FC players
Associação Portuguesa de Desportos players
Esporte Clube Bahia players
Sport Club do Recife players
Esporte Clube Vitória players
Associação Atlética Ponte Preta players
Sampaio Corrêa Futebol Clube players
Fluminense de Feira Futebol Clube players
Associação Atlética Internacional (Limeira) managers
ABC Futebol Clube managers
União Recreativa dos Trabalhadores managers
Guarani FC managers
América Futebol Clube (RN) managers
Centro Sportivo Alagoano managers
Associação Atlética Ponte Preta managers
Clube Náutico Capibaribe managers
Clube de Regatas Brasil managers
Sociedade Esportiva do Gama managers
Sociedade Esportiva Palmeiras managers
Ittihad FC managers
Associação Desportiva São Caetano managers
Coritiba Foot Ball Club managers
Grêmio Barueri Futebol managers
Associação Portuguesa de Desportos managers
Botafogo de Futebol e Regatas managers
Ceará Sporting Club managers
São Bernardo Futebol Clube managers
Oeste Futebol Clube managers
Esporte Clube XV de Novembro (Piracicaba) managers
Clube Atlético Sorocaba managers
Rio Claro Futebol Clube managers
Tupi Football Club managers
Clube Atlético Bragantino managers
Itumbiara Esporte Clube managers
Central Sport Club managers
Associação Atlética de Altos managers
Sociedade Imperatriz de Desportos managers
Footballers from São Paulo (state)